Dalla hesperioides is a species of butterfly in the family Hesperiidae. It is found in Colombia and Peru.

Subspecies
Dalla hesperioides hesperioides - Colombia
Dalla hesperioides hister Evans, 1955 - Peru

References

Butterflies described in 1867
hesperioides
Hesperiidae of South America
Taxa named by Baron Cajetan von Felder
Taxa named by Rudolf Felder